Ann Michelle (born 11 August 1952 in Chigwell, Essex) is a British actress and writer.
Her father Joseph was a fish trader at Billingsgate Fish Market and her mother Shirley an actress. One of her sisters is the actress Vicki Michelle. While her parents were at work, they employed Elke Sommer as an au-pair girl to look after Michelle and her three sisters.

Her earliest appearances included roles in Love in Our Time (1968) and an uncredited appearance in The Prime of Miss Jean Brodie (1969). Michelle's most notable acting role was as Jane Pettibone in the cult British horror film Psychomania (1973), and her other film appearances included roles in House of Whipcord (1974), Mistress Pamela (1974), Cruel Passion (1977), Young Lady Chatterley (1977), Haunted (1977), and French Quarter (1978).

Michelle also starred in Virgin Witch (1972) opposite her sister Vicki. She  later disowned Virgin Witch, according to an article in the Sarasota Herald of 12 November 1973, saying that the producer had just wanted nude scenes.

In 1981 Michelle had a prominent role in the TV adaptation of Levkas Man.

Michelle is a director of the Trading Faces celebrity agency.

She was married to the Reading Racers speedway rider Richard May.

References

External links
Official website

1952 births
Living people
English television actresses
People from Chigwell
Actresses from Essex
English film actresses